The Whitaker Baronetcy, of Babworth in the County of Nottingham, is a title in the Baronetage of the United Kingdom. It was created on 15 July 1936 for Albert Edward Whitaker. He was a colonel in the army and served as a justice of the peace, deputy lieutenant and high sheriff for Nottinghamshire. The second baronet was a major general in the Coldstream Guards.

The Labour politician Benjamin Whitaker was the brother of the third baronet.

Whitaker baronets, of Babworth (1936)
Sir Albert Edward Whitaker, 1st Baronet (1860–1945)
Sir John Albert Charles Whitaker, 2nd Baronet (1897–1957)
Sir James Herbert Ingham Whitaker, 3rd Baronet (1925–1999)
Sir John James Ingham Whitaker, 4th Baronet (born 1952)

The heir apparent to the baronetcy is Harry James Ingham Whitaker (born 1984), only son of the 4th Baronet.

Notes

References
Kidd, Charles, Williamson, David (editors). Debrett's Peerage and Baronetage (1990 edition). New York: St Martin's Press, 1990, 

Whitaker